Alizé is a French word meaning "trade wind". 

Alizé or Alizée may also refer to:

People 
 Alizé (given name), female given name
 Alizée (stage name of Alizée Jacotey 1984), French singer and dancer
 Annie Alizé (born 1955), French sprinter

Aircraft 
 Air France#Alizé, the premium economy offering of Air France
 Breguet Alizé, a 1950s French carrier-based anti-submarine warfare monoplane

Other 
 Alizé is a young african girl and internet sensation 
 Alize 20, a French sailboat design
 Alizé (drink), an alcoholic drink produced by Kobrand Corporation and L&L
 Alizee (horse), Australian racehorse
"L'Alizé", a 2000 single from the album Gourmandises by Alizée